Harden may refer to:

Places
 Harden, New South Wales, Australia
Harden railway station
Harden County
 Harden, Walsall, England
 Harden, West Yorkshire, England
 Harden City, Oklahoma, U.S.
 Harden (crater), on the Moon

Other uses
 "Harden", a song by Lil Wayne from the album Funeral
 Hardens, historic home and farm in Charles City County, Virginia, U.S.
 Harden's, a British restaurant guide
 Harden Furniture, an American furniture manufacturer 1844–2018

People with the given name Harden
Harden Askenasy (1908–1975),  Romanian Jewish scientist and professor of neurosurgery
Harden Bennion (1862–1936), American politician
Harden Cooper (1922–1990), American football player and coach
Harden Dean (1913–1982), Australian rules footballer
Harden M. McConnell (1927–2014), American chemist
Harden Sidney Melville (1821–1894), English painter, illustrator and draughtsman

People with the surname Harden
 Alex Harden (born 1993), American basketball player 
 Alice Harden (1948–2012), American politician
 Arlene Harden (born 1945), American country music singer
 Arthur Harden (1865–1940), British biochemist
 Blaine Harden (born 1952), American journalist and author
 Bobby Harden (born 1967), American football player
 Buddy Harden (born 1940), American politician
 Cecil M. Harden (1894–1984), American educator and politician
 Cedric Harden (born 1974), American football player
 Chad Harden (born 1970), Canadian professional chuckwagon racer
 Clinton Harden (born 1947), American politician
 Derrick Harden (born 1964), American football player
 Duane Harden (born 1971), German-born American musician
 Edgar L. Harden (1906–1996), American university president 
 Frank Harden (1922–2018), American radio announcer
 Geoff Harden (1943–2006), British journalist and folk music promoter
 Greg Harden (fl. from 1986), life coach and motivational speaker
 Gwen Harden (born 1940), Australian botanist and author
 Henry Eric Harden (1912–1945), English recipient of the Victoria Cross 
 Henry Scott Harden (1834–1879), Australian politician 
 Ingo Harden (born 1928), German music critic and writer
 James Harden (born 1989), American basketball player
 Janet Harden (1776-1837), Scottish diarist, also known as Jessy
 Joel Harden (born c. 1972), Canadian politician
 John Harden (1871–1931), Irish bishop
 Jonathan Harden (fl. from 2001), Northern Irish actor and director 
 Joseph Harden (1824–1864), African American missionary
 Krysta Harden (fl. 2013–2016), American government official 
 Leon Harden (1947–2017), American football player
 Marcia Gay Harden (born 1959), American actress
 Martin Harden (1876–unknown), Czech fencer
 Maximilian Harden (1861–1927), German journalist
 Michael Harden (born 1981), American football player
 Mike Harden (born 1959), American football player
 Paige Harden (fl. from 2009), American psychologist
 Rich Harden (born 1981), Canadian baseball player
 Richard Harden (cricketer) (born 1965), English cricketer
 Richard Harden (politician) (1916–2000), Northern Irish politician
 Rupert Harden (born 1985), Australian-born English rugby player
 Sheldon Harden (1920–2005), American football player
 Theodore Harden (1830–1900), Australian politician
 Thomas C. Harden (c.1856 – 1925), American politician
 Tim Harden (born 1974), American athlete 
 Ty Harden (born 1984), American soccer player 
 Wilbur Harden (1924–1969), American jazz musician
 Wolf Harden (born 1962), German classical pianist

See also
 
 
 Hardening (disambiguation)
 Hardin (disambiguation)